Fatal Charm may refer to:

 Fatal Charm (band), a band from Nottingham, England
 Fatal Charm, an album by The Mumps, see Lance Loud
 Fearless (1978 film), an Italian poliziottesco film, also known as Fatal Charm
 Fatal Charm (1990 film), a 1990 American thriller film